Shenzhen Changhong Technology Co., Ltd. is a Chinese plastic parts and injection mold-maker. It was listed on the Shenzhen Stock Exchange ChiNext board on 22 December 2010 using stock code  with  registered capital. It was one of three companies to be listed on that day (along with IREAL and QHT) and one of 117 firms to be listed that year.

The "CHT Group" has subsidiaries in Shenzhen, Shanghai, Heyuan, Anhui, and Hong Kong with their headquarters in Pingshan New District, Shenzhen, Guangdong, China.

Major customers include Konica Minolta Inc., Brother Industries, for whom they produce tooling and parts for Multifunction Printers, Thermo Fisher and Beijing Xiaomi Technology Co., Ltd.

As at 9 November 2016, Changhong Technology was a constituent of SZSE 1000 Index (as well as sub-index SZSE 700 Index) but not in SZSE Component Index, making the company was ranked between the 501st to 1,000th by free float adjusted market capitalization.

Ownership
The public listing was funded in cash with 49.91% being paid by the company Chairman Li Huanchang (李焕昌). Heyuan subsidiary General Manager Hua Shoufu (华守夫) paid 7.86% and Shanghai subsidiary General Manager Xu Yanping (徐燕平) contributed 5.99% of the investment.

Additional investors include the Shenzhen Zhongke Hongyi Venture Investment Co., Ltd. - 深圳市中科宏易创业投资有限公司 (3.73%), Zhejiang Lianheng Venture Capital Co., Ltd. - 浙江联盛创业投资有限公司 (3.73%) and Deng Shiyan - 邓世珩 (1.05%).  The remaining 27.73% was raised from numerous other sources.

Names and Locations
On December 20, 2007, the company changed its name from Shenzhen Changhong Hardware Manufacture Co., Ltd. to Shenzhen Changhong Mold Technology Co., Ltd. and then on May 15, 2012 to its current name 'Shenzhen Changhong Technology Co., Ltd.' to reflect changes to its business approach.

On December 16, 2005, the company relocated from Jianxin Village, Ailian Village, Longgang Town, Longgang District, Shenzhen to its current address on the Westside of Jinlong Avenue in Pingshan New District.

See also

 Injection Moulding

References

External links 
 

Manufacturing companies based in Shenzhen
Chinese companies established in 2001
Companies listed on the Shenzhen Stock Exchange